Aquaman: King of Atlantis is an American three-part animated miniseries produced by James Wan for the streaming service HBO Max, based on the DC Comics character Aquaman. The series is produced by DC Entertainment, Warner Bros. Animation and Atomic Monster Productions. It is set after the events of Wan's 2018 DC Extended Universe (DCEU) film Aquaman, but is not canonical to the DCEU.

The miniseries began on October 14, 2021 and subsequent episodes were released on a weekly basis. It also aired as a feature-length film on Cartoon Network on May 14, 2022; the movie version was later released on DVD on June 21. It was originally set to air as part of the ACME Night block.

The miniseries was removed from HBO Max in August 2022.

Premise
Alongside trusted allies Mera and Vulko, King Aquaman faces unscrupulous surface dwellers, ancient evils from beyond time, and his half-brother's attempts to overthrow him all to prove that he's the right man for the throne.

Voice cast

Main
 Cooper Andrews as Aquaman
 Gillian Jacobs as Mera
 Thomas Lennon as Vulko
 Dana Snyder as Ocean Master
 Snyder also voices Robot Hands in Chapter 1
 Andrew Morgado as Petyr Mortikov

Recurring
 Chris Jai Alex as Toby (Chapter 1), Atlantean Guard (Chapter 2), Atlantean One (Chapter 3)
 Kevin Michael Richardson as Royal Announcer
 Richardson also voices Orca in Chapter 1 & Chapter 3
 Flula Borg as Mantis (Chapter 1 & Chapter 3)
 Kimberly Brooks as Hammer (Chapter 1 & Chapter 3)
 Kaitlyn Robrock as Gillian, Merdussa (Chapter 1 & Chapter 3)
 Trevor Devall as Elderly Man (Chapter 2 & Chapter 3) 
 Armen Taylor as Chef (Chapter 2 & Chapter 3)

Guest
 Robbie Daymond as Finhead (Chapter 1)
 Regi Davis as Fisherman, Primordeus (Chapter 2)
 Erica Ash as Wendy (Chapter 2)
 Laila Berzins as Boss Crab (Chapter 2)
 Erica Lindbeck as Peasant (Chapter 2)

Episodes

Production
A three-part animated miniseries based on the DC Comics character Aquaman was announced in January 2020. James Wan, who directed the 2018 live-action film and its upcoming 2023 sequel, serves as executive producer. The miniseries premiered on HBO Max. The characters Mera, Vulko, and Ocean Master also appear in the series. The series aired on Cartoon Network on May 14, 2022. It was originally going to air as part of the ACME Night block. Aquaman: King of Atlantis was released on October 14, 2021.

Notes

References

External links

2021 American television series debuts
2021 American television series endings
2020s American animated television series
American children's animated action television series
American children's animated science fantasy television series
American children's animated superhero television series
Animated television shows based on DC Comics
Alternative sequel television series
Aquaman in other media
English-language television shows
HBO Max original programming
Superhero web series
Television series by Warner Bros. Animation